Ekrem Hayyam Dağ (born 5 December 1980) is a Turkish-Austrian football coach and a former player. He is the manager of Turkish club Göztepe.

Club career 
Dağ started his career at SVL Flavia Solva but joined the youth team of SK Sturm Graz in 1997 where he made his professional debut four years later. In the summer of 2005 he returned to the land of his birth and signed for Gaziantepspor. In the summer of 2008, after three seasons in Gaziantep, Dağ signed in summer 2008 for Beşiktaş J.K. On 28 July Besiktas canceled his contract with permission of Dağ himself. In July 2012 Ekrem joined his former club Gaziantepspor.

Position 
Dağ is an all-rounder and has played as right back, winger, right midfielder or in the left midfield.

International career 
Dağ was born in Turkey but came to Austria with his family when he was 8 years old. His father was a Gastarbeiter. Dağ grew up in Leibnitz and holds Austrian and Turkish dual nationality, making him eligible for both countries. Dağ chose Austria over Turkey, and was due to make his debut on 31 May 2009; however this dream was stopped by injury. Dağ was called up to the Austrian national team again on 10 October 2009 for the game against Lithuania, but was an unused substitute. His first cap eventually came in a friendly against Denmark on 3 March 2010. Austria won the match 2–1.

Honours

Beşiktaş
 Süper Lig: 2008–09
 Turkish Cup: 2008–09, 2010–11

References

External links

 
 
 
 

1980 births
Living people
People from Mardin
Austrian footballers
Austria international footballers
Turkish footballers
Naturalised citizens of Austria
Turkish emigrants to Austria
SK Sturm Graz players
Beşiktaş J.K. footballers
Gaziantepspor footballers
Austrian Football Bundesliga players
Süper Lig players
Association football midfielders
Austrian football managers
Göztepe S.K. managers